Municipal elections in Israel are elections in which the residents of the cities and local councils in Israel vote for the chairman of the local authority (mayor or municipality chairman), as well as for members of the city councils or the local councils.

History
From 1950 to 1973, local elections were held the same day as national elections. The mayors of jurisdictions were elected by city or local councils, and from among its members. This maintained party stability.

In 1975, the government changed the schedule for municipal elections to every five years, rather than on the same schedule as the national legislative elections. The intention was to strengthen local politics, but the change in election day appears to have contributed to decreasing participation in voting on the local level, especially in large cities.

In 1978, another reform established a double ballot: For the first time, voters could vote directly for the mayor (by popular vote) and for a party list for seats on the city or local council. The Knesset established that a candidate needs at least 40% of the total votes order to be elected to the position of the chairman or mayor of the local authority. If no candidate gets 40% of the votes, a second round of elections is held. In this run-off, only the top two candidates compete against each other.

According to the Local Authorities Elections Law (חוק הבחירות לרשויות המקומיות), both Israeli citizens and permanent residents who are not citizens (e. g., the Palestinians of East Jerusalem), are eligible to vote for their local authorities. (In national elections, however, only Israeli citizens may vote.) Persons are considered eligible to vote in municipal elections at the age of 17 years, or older. (In national elections, by contrast, citizens must be aged 18, or older, to vote).

The contenders in the municipal elections are mostly representatives of the parties who also compete in the legislative elections. In addition, there may be numerous candidates who are not affiliated with a major political party. At times, voters will elected split tickets: a mayor who is independent or from one party, and a list of candidates for city council who are from another party.

The municipal elections day is classified as a sabbatical for workers who reside within the voting area. No media campaigns are broadcast on television or radio prior to the election day.

Some municipalities do not hold elections in every cycle. For instance, parties may decide to support one candidate for the position of mayor, or to support a joint list of city council or the local council members. For example, in 2008, municipal elections were not held in Bnei Brak and in Modi'in Illit for this reason.

References

External links 
 Information on the Ministry of Interior website (Hebrew)
 Extensive information and a professional guide for candidates in the local authority elections (Hebrew)